Dillman is an unincorporated community in Jackson Township, Wells County, in the U.S. state of Indiana.

History
Dillman was named after Andrew Dillman, an early settler.

A post office was established at Dillman in 1880, and remained in operation until it was discontinued in 1907.

Dillman Church was founded in Dillman in 1889 and dedicated on December 22 of that year by Bishop Milton Wright.

Geography

References

Unincorporated communities in Wells County, Indiana
Unincorporated communities in Indiana